The Lens-Béthune bus network, more commonly known as Tadao, is a bus network in northern France, centered around the towns of Lens and Béthune. It is the network of the Syndicat Mixte des Transports Artois-Gohelle and services the agglomeration communities of Lens – Liévin, Hénin-Carvin and Béthune-Bruay, comprising a total of 114 communes. Most of its services are operated by Transdev Artois-Gohelle, part of the company Transdev.

Services
Tadao operates standard bus services as well as numerous shuttle bus services, telebus services, services for passengers with limited mobility, services for work commuters and school bus services.

References 

Public transport operators in France
Bus companies of France
Transport in Pas-de-Calais
Transdev